Canute I may refer to:

 Canute I of Denmark (born c. 890)
 Canute I of England, the Great (and Cnut II of Denmark) (c. 985 or 995 – 1035)
 Canute I of Sweden (born before 1150 – 1195/96)